Colo may refer to:

Places
Colo (volcano), in Indonesia
Colo, Iowa, United States
Colo, New South Wales, Australia
Colo River, in Australia
Colo., an abbreviation for the U.S. state of Colorado
A former name of Duaringa, Queensland, Australia

People with the surname
Don Colo (born 1925), American football player
Papo Colo (born 1946), Puerto Rican artist
Licia Colò (born 1962), Italian television hostess and journalist
Zeno Colò (1920–1993), Italian alpine skier
Nando de Colo (born 1987), French basketball player

Other
Colo (film)
Colo (gorilla), the first gorilla born into captivity
An alternate name for the Alemow (Citrus × macrophylla)
A colloquial term for the French École Nationale de la France d'Outre-Mer
Short for colocation centre

See also
 Colo-Colo
 Colos (disambiguation)
 Colocolo (disambiguation)

sr:Коло